The NHL's Northwest Division was formed in 1998 as part of the Western Conference due to expansion. The teams in the Pacific Division were split up, with the Calgary Flames, Colorado Avalanche, Edmonton Oilers, and the Vancouver Canucks becoming the newly formed Northwest Division. The Minnesota Wild joined the division in 2000 as an expansion team. Like the Pacific Division, the Northwest Division is also a descendant of the former Smythe Division, as three of its Canadian teams played in that division from 1981 to 1993.

The Northwest Division existed for 14 seasons (not including the cancelled 2004–05 season) until 2013. During that time, it had the greatest distances between teams in the entire NHL.

Division lineups

1998–2000
 Calgary Flames
 Colorado Avalanche
 Edmonton Oilers
 Vancouver Canucks

Changes from the 1997–98 season
 The Northwest Division is formed as a result of NHL realignment
 The Calgary Flames, Colorado Avalanche, Edmonton Oilers and Vancouver Canucks come from the Pacific Division

2000–2013
 Calgary Flames
 Colorado Avalanche
 Edmonton Oilers
 Minnesota Wild
 Vancouver Canucks

Changes from the 1999–2000 season
 The Minnesota Wild are added as an expansion team

After the 2012–13 season
The Northwest Division was dissolved as the league realigned into two conferences with two divisions each. The division's Canadian teams (the Calgary Flames, Edmonton Oilers, and Vancouver Canucks) returned to the Pacific Division, while the division's American teams (the Colorado Avalanche and Minnesota Wild) joined the Central Division.

Division champions
 1999 – Colorado Avalanche (44–28–10, 98 pts)
 2000 – Colorado Avalanche (42–28–11–1, 96 pts)
 2001 – Colorado Avalanche (52–16–10–4, 118 pts)
 2002 – Colorado Avalanche (45–28–8–1, 99 pts)
 2003 – Colorado Avalanche (42–19–13–8, 105 pts)
 2004 – Vancouver Canucks (43–24–10–5, 101 pts)
 2005 – no season (NHL lockout)
 2006 – Calgary Flames (46–25–11, 103 pts)
 2007 – Vancouver Canucks (49–26–7, 105 pts)
 2008 – Minnesota Wild (44–28–10, 98 pts)
 2009 – Vancouver Canucks (45–27–10, 100 pts)
 2010 – Vancouver Canucks (49–28–5, 103 pts)
 2011 – Vancouver Canucks (54–19–9, 117 pts)
 2012 – Vancouver Canucks (51–22–9, 111 pts)
 2013 – Vancouver Canucks (26–15–7, 59 pts)

Season results

Notes
 The 2012–13 NHL season was shortened to 48 games due to the lockout.

Stanley Cup winners produced
 2001 – Colorado Avalanche

Presidents' Trophy winners produced
 2001 – Colorado Avalanche
 2011 – Vancouver Canucks
 2012 – Vancouver Canucks

Northwest Division titles won by team

References

 NHL History

 
National Hockey League divisions